Pinin may refer to:

 Pinin (PNN protein) a protein encoded by the PNN gene

People
 Battista Farina (1893-1966), nicknamed "Pinin"; car designer, founder of Pininfarina
 Dmitri Pinin (born 1975) Russian soccer player and coach

Transportation
 Mitsubishi Pinin (1998-2007) compact SUV
 Ferrari Pinin (1980) concept car

See also

Pininfarina (disambiguation)
PNN (disambiguation)